Louis Banks (born Dambar Bahadur Budaprithi on 11 February 1941) is an Indian film composer, record producer, keyboardist, and singer. He has often been referred to as the 'Godfather of Indian jazz'.

Early life
Louis Banks was born to Indian Gorkha parents Sarswati and George Banks, a musician, in his hometown of Darjeeling. His early music education was at the hands of his father and neighbour Mrs. Myers. His father Pushkar Bahadur, a Nepalese trumpeter moved to Calcutta in the early 1940s to join a European Band in the city, subsequently he changed his name to George Banks. His grandfather, Bakhat Bahadur Budapirti, had composed the Nepalese national anthem Shreeman Gambhira Nepali which was the official anthem from 1962 to 2006.

He did his schooling at St. Roberts School, Darjeeling. Sensing Banks's interest in western music when at the age of thirteen he started playing the guitar and the trumpet, his father changed his name to Louis Banks in tribute to Louis Armstrong. This change of name gave the young Banks the confidence to make it big in the world of western music. He started receiving piano lessons from his father and also played in his band. Banks went to college at St. Joseph's College in Darjeeling, where he continued to study piano.

Career
After college Banks moved to Kathmandu with his father's band and decided to become a full-time musician, it was there he discovered jazz music. In the late 1960s, he performed at the Soaltee Hotel in Kathmandu, for three years. During his stay there he rejected an offer from R. D. Burman to work with him in Mumbai. Not happy in Kathmandu, Banks moved base to Calcutta in 1971, where he met singer Pam Craine and saxophonist Braz Gonsalves and formed The Louis Banks Brotherhood. The band began performing at the Hindustan Hotel which led to an invitation to play at the Blue Fox Restaurant, a popular night club famous for its patronage of live western music. From there on he was able to get work composing advertisement jingles and stage musicals.

In 1977, Banks approached R. D. Burman, who was a frequent visitor to the Blue Fox Restaurant and asked Burman to let him join his troupe in Mumbai, Burman happily took him in. In Mumbai, Banks was introduced to different world music genres and he was able to thrive in the rich music scene. As he cemented his place and reputation in the city he popularised live jazz at Mumbai nightclubs. In 1979, along with Goan saxophonist Braz Gonsalves he formed the 'Indo-Jazz Ensemble', composing music on Indian classical scales and Jazz rhythms, incorporating Indian instruments like ghatam and thavil. In February 1980, he was a member of the jazz quartet which was part of the orchestra to perform with Ravi Shankar in his noted suite Jazzmine at the 'Jazz Yatra' Festival. He also formed a group called Sangam teaming up with Carnatic classical vocalist, Ramamani and together they performed about 60 concerts all over Europe and participated in festivals, the group however was short-lived as Ramamani was from Bangalore, while Louis was based in Mumbai and the logistics became too difficult. In 2005, Banks formed a group Rhythm Asia with Taufeeq Qureshi on the tabla and Niladri Kumar on the sitar.

In 1988, Banks composed the tunes to the iconic Mile Sur Mera Tumhara, a short film on national integration for Doordarshan, at that time India's sole broadcaster. Due to its popularity, the tune has often been dubbed the unofficial Indian anthem. Banks would go on to provide music to similar patriotic short films like Desh raag and Spread the light of freedom. In 1990 he composed music for the Malayalam-language experimental silent film Vembanad. India Today described his music as one of the highlights of the critically acclaimed film. He formed a new band called 'Silk' with Shankar Mahadevan, Sivamani and Karl Peters. He has performed at various concerts and with well-known jazz artists such as Radha Thomas and Joe Alvares. He has provided the musical score to a number of Hindi films and two English films Bokshua, The Myth and God Only Knows, a comedy satire directed by Bharat Dabholkar. He also provided the score for Roshni a musical, directed by Alyque Padamsee. He is working on a progressive fusion jazz album titled Labyrinth with his son's band Nexus.

His 2008 collaboration as co producer, arranger and pianist/keyboards on the album Miles from India, a tribute to the founder of modern jazz Miles Davis was nominated for the Grammy Awards 2008 in the Best Contemporary Jazz Album category. In the same category, John McLaughlin's fusion album Floating Pointwas also nominated, Banks was the featured keyboardist on the album.

Personal life
He is married to Lorraine originally from India. They have four children, Andre, Gino Banks, Neil, and Monique. Gino Banks is an accomplished drummer and member of the fusion band 'Nexus'. Banks lives and works from Juhu, Mumbai.

Filmography

Discography

See also 
 List of Jazz Arrangers

References

External links
Interview with Louis Banks at The Times of India

1941 births
Bollywood playback singers
Indian film score composers
Indian jazz musicians
Indian male playback singers
Indian Gorkhas
Jazz composers
Jazz fusion arrangers
Jazz fusion musicians
Jazz keyboardists
Living people
People from Darjeeling
Indian male film score composers
Male jazz composers
Nepali-language singers from India